Pedasa ( or τὰ Πήδασα), also known as Pedasus or Pedasos (Πήδασος), and as Pedasum, was a town of ancient Caria. Alexander the Great deprived the place of its independence by giving it over to the Halicarnassians, together with five other neighbouring towns.

It was a member of the Delian League.

Its site is near the modern Gökçeler.

People
Hermotimus of Pedasa, favourite eunuch of Xerxes the Great

References

Populated places in ancient Caria
Former populated places in Turkey
Greek city-states
Members of the Delian League
Bodrum District
History of Muğla Province